is a former professional Japanese baseball player.

External links

1976 births
Living people
Baseball people from Tokushima Prefecture
Japanese baseball players
Nippon Professional Baseball pitchers
Nippon Ham Fighters players
Hokkaido Nippon-Ham Fighters players